Les Authieux-Papion is a former commune in the Calvados department in the Normandy region of north-western France. On 1 January 2017, it was merged into the new commune Mézidon Vallée d'Auge.

Geography
Les Authieux-Papion is located some 14 km south-west of Lisieux and 11 km north-east of Saint-Pierre-sur-Dives. The D47 road runs along the northern border of the commune from Mézidon-Canon in the west to join the D511 which runs down the eastern border of the commune from Saint-Julien-le-Faucon in the north-east to Saint-Pierre-sur-Dives in the south-west. Access to the village is by local roads off these two roads. There is a large forest towards the south (the Bois des Authieux) and another large forest in the north with the rest of the commune farmland.

The Viette river flows through the centre of the commune from east to west as it flows west then north to join the Vie at Le Mesnil-Mauger.

Administration

List of Successive Mayors

Demography
In 2017 the commune had 63 inhabitants.

Sites and monuments

In the Parish Church of Saint-Philbert there is a Statue: Virgin and child (15th century) which is registered as an historical object.

See also
Communes of the Calvados department

References

External links
les Autieux Papion on the 1750 Cassini Map

Former communes of Calvados (department)
Populated places disestablished in 2017